Tiong Se Academy, (abbreviation TSA) formerly known as Anglo-Chinese School and Philippine Tiong Se Academy, is a non-profit, non-sectarian private Chinese school located at Sta. Elena Street, Binondo, Manila near 168 Shopping Mall, the Cityplace Square, and Lucky Chinatown Mall. It was established on April 15, 1899 in response to the growing need of education in the post-Spanish era Chinese community. The school turned the first page of formal Chinese education in the Philippines, earning the recognition of being the country's pioneer and oldest Chinese school.

History
Tiong Se Academy was established as the "Anglo Chinese School" on April 15, 1899 by Engracio Palanca, the first Chinese consul to the Philippines, as well as the only son of Carlos Palanca. Tankang solicited funds from the Chinese community in the Philippines for the school's foundation. It first held classes at the backyard of the Imperial Chinese Consulate General. The school moved to San Fernando Street in 1899; to Salazar Street in 1909, to then Sacristia Street now Ongpin Street in 1910, and to Santa Elena Street in 1912.

The school was closed in 1942 following the Japanese occupation of the Philippines during World War II and was opened again in 1945. Due to the Filipinization of foreign schools in the country in the 1970s, the school's name was changed to "Tiong Se Academy" on February 24, 1975. The National Historical Commission of the Philippines credited the school as a model for educational institutions for Chinese and Filipino-Chinese people.

Curricula

English curriculum

K-12 Basic Education System

Since school year 2012–2013, the school complies with the K-12 Basic Education Curriculum implemented by the Department of Education and is now effective for all levels in Kindergarten, Elementary, High School departments. The school will now offer complete senior high school levels for Academic Track (General Academics Strand and Accountancy, Business and Management Strand).

Chinese curriculum
The school's Chinese curriculum is proposed to follow the 12-year basic education system. Subjects to be taught for senior high school levels were under study and were expected to be offered in June 2016 with the Grade 11 English classes. TSA uses the simplified Chinese characters for teaching Chinese since the first semester of school year 2007–2008 for elementary and high school levels and since June 2012 for pre-school.

In elementary and high school levels, TSA maintains a three-period-per-day (fifteen periods a week) policy as mandated by the Filipinization law of the late President Marcos, which is in effect to date.

In June 2012, the school added a new Chinese Culture (文化) subject to educate today's generation of Filipino-Chinese of the culture of their ancestors.

Notable alumni 
 Felipe Lee Yung-Shaw (李炳祥) (1905 – June 12, 1959) Participant at the 1919 May Fourth Movement in Beijing, China, joined the guerilla forces in the Philippines during the Second World War 
 Tan Tiong Gong (陈忠赣), ninth principal of ACS, Batch 1919 Chinese Day Class
 Ralph Nubla Sr. (高祖儒), former chairman of PTSA Board of Trustees, former Chairman and President, Philippine Bank of Communications (PBCom), and former president, Federation of Filipino-Chinese Chambers of Commerce & Industry, Inc. (1966–1970, 1981–1985)
 Claudio Teehankee, Sr. (郑建祥), 16th Chief Justice of the Supreme Court of the Philippines (He swore in President Corazon C. Aquino in 1986.), Batch 1929 English Day Class
 Jimmy T. Tang (董尚真), former president, Federation of Filipino-Chinese Chambers of Commerce and Industry, Inc. (1993–1997)
 Teresita Ang-See (洪玉华), founder of Kaisa Para sa Kaunlaran, Batch 1962

See also
List of Chinese schools in the Philippines

References

External links
 Facebook – Tiong Se Academy
 Twitter – Tiong Se Academy
 Tiong Se Academy – PCERC.org

Educational institutions established in 1899
Chinese-language schools in Manila
Education in Binondo
High schools in Manila
1899 establishments in the Philippines